Canadian Journal of Public Health is a peer-reviewed scientific journal of public health published by the Canadian Public Health Association on a bimonthly basis. It was originally established in 1910 as the Public Health Journal, which became Canadian Public Health Journal in 1928, and acquired its current name in 1943. It is edited by Louise Potvin (Université de Montréal). Articles published by the journal become openly accessible 6 months after publication. In 2013, the journal become online only.

In French, the journal is known as Revue Canadienne de Santé Publique (previously Revue Canadienne d'Hygiène Publique).

External links
 

Public health journals
Publications established in 1910
Delayed open access journals
English-language journals
French-language journals
Multilingual journals
Academic journals published by non-profit organizations of Canada